Warley Place is a  nature reserve south of Brentwood in Essex. It is managed by the Essex Wildlife Trust.

In the late nineteenth and early twentieth centuries this site was the garden of the leading horticulturalist, Ellen Willmott, who planted many plants from all over the world, some of which still survive. There is a line of mature sweet chestnuts, and flowers including daffodils, snowdrops and crocuses.

There is access next to the Thatchers Arms pub at the junction of Warley Road and Dark Lane.

References

 Essex Wildlife Trust